Sadreh or Sedrah may refer to:
 Sadreh 1
 Sadreh-ye Soveylat

See also
 Sedreh